Mona Santoso (born 17 August 1982) is an Indonesian former badminton player, and later represented United States. Santoso was part of the Indonesia national team from 1998 to 2000. As a junior player, Santoso was the girls' singles champion at the 1998 Hong Kong Junior Championships, she also helped the Indonesian girls' team clinched the silver medal at the 1999 Asian Junior Championships, and the mixed team bronze medal at the 2000 World Junior Championships. Santoso won the women's doubles title at the 1999 Indonesian National Championships partnered with Vita Marissa. Santoso started her career as a badminton coach in Pola Bugar Club Jakarta from 2005–2006, and in 2006, she moved to Sunnyvale Community Center in Sunnyvale, California. Santoso then played for the United States, and won the U.S. National Championships title in 2008 and 2009.

Achievements

BWF Grand Prix 
The BWF Grand Prix had two levels, the Grand Prix and Grand Prix Gold. It was a series of badminton tournaments sanctioned by the Badminton World Federation (BWF) and played between 2007 and 2017.

Women's singles

Women's doubles

  BWF Grand Prix Gold tournament
  BWF Grand Prix tournament

IBF International 
Mixed doubles

References

External links 

 

1982 births
Living people
People from Surakarta
Indonesian female badminton players
American female badminton players
21st-century American women
21st-century Indonesian women
20th-century Indonesian women